The Métis Nation of Ontario (MNO) is an organization for people who self-identify as Métis in Ontario. It consists of representatives at the provincial and local levels.

History of mixed Indigenous and European people in Ontario 
Mixed Indigenous-European populations have existed in Ontario since the arrival of fur traders into the northwestern Great Lakes and northeastern Ontario in the 1600s. The two major fur trading companies, the Hudson's Bay Company and the North West Company, both banned employees from having relationships with Indigenous women, but that did not stop some of the men from doing so. While many Métis were of French descent, according to Campbell, there was a significant Anglo-Métis population around the Great Lakes and James Bay areas, who were the result of marriages à la façon du pays between Indigenous women and English or Scottish fur traders and British soldiers. Peterson writes that there were mixed populations that started to live around forts run by these companies, particularly around places such as Sault Ste. Marie, near the present U.S.-Canada border, and along James Bay in communities that today are known as Moosonee and Moose Factory. Andersen, Chartrand and Reimer posit that the Métis community in Red River could possibly be descended from this group. However, most products of these unions "either integrated into Indigenous communities or assimilated with European newcomers, unlike the distinct Metis People of Louis Riel in Western Canada" who developed a particular, unique culture.

Whether or not these people in Ontario self-identified as Métis at the time is a matter of serious dispute. The recent rise in self-identified Métis in Ontario both challenges the common narrative that the Métis community developed solely in the Red River area, as well as raises concerns for many about the issue of settler self-indigenization. It has been argued by scholars and elders of recognized Indigenous communities in the region that calling this community "Métis" is an act of settler self-indigenization, as "people of mixed blood in the region either integrated into Indigenous communities or assimilated with European newcomers, unlike the distinct Metis People of Louis Riel in Western Canada" and that "there was no such thing as a Metis community here in this region." Andersen writes that to call these people "Métis" is an inappropriate "racialization" - placing an inaccurate, colonial label based on "misrecognition" of perceived or imagined racial differences, rather than on actual socio-cultural attributes.

History of the MNO 
The Métis Nation of Ontario was formed in 1993, along with associations in other provinces and territories, to provide a political platform for those who identify as Métis in Ontario. This was first tested in 2003 in the R. vs. Powley (2003) Supreme Court of Canada ruling that recognized the Métis as Indigenous people with rights to hunt and fish in accordance with their traditional lifestyles and developed a test of Métis identity now known as the "Powley test". This contrasted with a definition developed by the MNO which focuses on self-identification as Métis, having at least one Indigenous grandparent, and whose application was accepted by the MNO.

Structure 
The MNO governance structure is set up in a style similar to a democratically elected, provincial government. The Community Councils serve as the main connection point between MNO citizens and the provincial leadership. Assistance and resources are provided by the MNO to the Community Councils to carry out their mandates and making sure they are managed well. Each Community Council also has a seat for a Youth representative that works with the Métis Nation of Ontario Youth Council and stands for Métis youth in the region.

The provincial leadership takes the form of the Provisional Council of the Métis Nation of Ontario (PCMNO), which is accountable to MNO citizens at their Annual General Assemblies. It deals with issues and decisions that affect the Métis as a whole throughout Ontario. The PCMNO has an Executive section with five members, nine councilors for the different regions of Ontario, representatives for the youth and university-age segments of the populations, and four senators. The current president is Margaret Froh, who is the first female president of the MNO. A lawyer by training, she has worked previously in Indigenous law and in administration and policy at the MNO.

Concerns about meeting Métis criteria 
At the 2018 Annual General Meeting of the Métis National Council (MNC), National Council vice-president David Chartrand expressed concerns about how the Ontario Métis organization defines people as Métis. The MNC suspended the Ontario body's membership in the governance institutions of the Métis Nation. The National Council also raised concerns that 90% of the purported Métis who have registered with the Ontario group did not fulfill the requirements of citizenship put in place by the Council in 2002, notably the requirement for an ancestral link to the Métis homelands and the Red River area specifically. 

If they want to end the suspension, the Métis National Council resolved that the MNO must implement a stricter definition of Métis status. In response to the Council's resolution, MNO Vice President France Picotte said that she didn't care about the ruling because, "[The Council] has no authority over us."

During the COVID-19 pandemic, the MNO received a $205,000 grant from the Public Health Agency of Canada's Immunization Partnership Fund to increase uptake of COVID-19 vaccines among Métis citizens in Ontario.

References 

Political organizations based in Canada
Métis in Ontario
Indigenous organizations in Canada
Métis organizations
Indigenous organizations in Ontario